The Canadian Navigable Waters Act (the Act) (formerly the Navigation Protection Act and beforehand the Navigable Waters Protection Act) is one of the oldest regulatory statutes enacted by the Parliament of Canada. It requires approval for any works that may affect navigation on navigable waters in Canada.

History
Following the decision of the Judicial Committee of the Privy Council in McLaren v. Caldwell, the Parliament asserted its jurisdiction by enacting An Act respecting Bridges over the navigable waters, constructed under the authority of Provincial Acts, which received royal assent on 17 May 1882. Originally extending only to the construction of bridges, its scope was enlarged in 1883 to cover bridges, booms, dams and causeways, and in 1886 to cover wharves, docks, piers and other structures. These provisions were consolidated in the publication of the Revised Statutes of Canada, 1886. It was assigned the short title of the Navigable Waters Protection Act on the publication of the Revised Statutes of Canada, 1906.

From 1882 to 1966, the Act was administered by the Department of Public Works.

By 2002, it was described as a "federal statute designed to protect the public’s right to navigation and marine safety in the navigable waters of Canada." The Act was "administered by the Navigable Waters Protection Program (NWPP) under the Canadian Coast Guard (CCG) of the Department of Fisheries and Oceans.

In 2004, responsibility for the Act was transferred to Transport Canada.

The Canadian Coast Guard (CCG) may also be consulted regarding navigation issues.

Application
Works that affect navigation are subject to federal approval under the Act, which is generally coordinated with corresponding provincial approvals (as the beds of navigable waters are generally reserved to the Crown in right of the province)

The Act was amended in March 2009 in order to simplify procedures. As a consequence, the Minor Works and Waters Order was passed to provide for exempting minor works and waters from the Act's application.

In 2012, the Act was amended by the Jobs and Growth Act, 2012 to provide for:

 the limitation of the Act’s application to works in certain navigable waters that are set out in its schedule,
 it to be deemed to apply to certain works in other navigable waters, with the approval of the Minister of Transport,
 an assessment process for certain works and to provide that works that are assessed as likely to substantially interfere with navigation require the Minister’s approval, and
 administrative monetary penalties and additional offences.

The amendments came into force in April 2014.

The Bridge To Strengthen Trade Act exempts the construction of the new Detroit River International Crossing from the scope of the Act.

Scope of the Act
In Friends of the Oldman River Society v. Canada, La Forest J of the Supreme Court of Canada considered what the proper scope of federal jurisdiction with respect to environmental matters, and declared:

Definition of Navigable Waters
Until recently, the Act was relatively silent about what constituted navigable waters, saying only that a they included "a canal and any other body of water created or altered as a result of the construction of any work." The Supreme Court of Canada, however, adopted the "floating canoe" threshold in 1906, holding that any water that was navigable and floatable was within its scope.

"The definition of ‘navigable water’ is broad and inclusive, and must be interpreted by relying upon a definition provided in the NWPA and related jurisprudence. Briefly, if a
craft is able to pass over a body of water, the body of water would be considered navigable. The craft could be as large as a steamship or as small as a canoe or a raft."

In 2011, the Ontario Superior Court of Justice concluded that the common law of navigability “requires that the waterway be navigable” and “must be capable in its natural state of being traversed by large or small craft of some sort.” It summarized the Canadian jurisprudence on this matter as follows:

A stream, to be navigable in law, must be navigable in fact. That is, it must be capable in its natural state of being traversed by large or small craft of some sort—as large as steam vessels and as small as canoes, skiffs and rafts drawing less than one foot of water.
"Navigable" also means "floatable" in the sense that the river or stream is used or is capable of use to float logs, log-rafts and booms.
A river or stream may be navigable over part of its course and not navigable over other parts.
To be navigable in law, a river or stream need not in fact be used for navigation so long as realistically it is capable of being so used.
According to the Civil Code of Quebec, the river or stream must be capable of navigation in furtherance of trade and commerce. The test according to the law of Quebec is thus navigability for commercial purposes, but that is not applicable in the common law provinces.
The underlying concept of navigability in law is that the river or stream is a public aqueous highway used or capable of use by the public.
Navigation need not be continuous but may fluctuate seasonally.
Interruptions to navigation such as rapids on an otherwise navigable stream which may, by improvements such as canals be readily circumvented, do not render the river or stream non-navigable in law at those points.
A stream not navigable in its natural state may become so as a result of artificial improvements.

Therefore, navigable waters include all bodies of water that are capable of being navigated by any type of floating vessel for transportation, recreation or commerce. In that respect, frequency of navigation may not be a factor in determining a navigable waterway  if it has the potential to be navigated, it will be determined “navigable”.

In 2019, the definition was replaced by the following:

This was held to have ousted the common law definition, according to a judgment of the Superior Court of Ontario in 2020.

Attempted amendments
A paper commissioned for the Walkerton Inquiry reported:

References

Further reading
 
 

1880s in the environment
1882 in Canadian law
Canadian federal legislation
Waterways
Environmental law in Canada
Water transport in Canada